Nathalie Benoit (born 12 June 1980 in Aix en Provence) is a French Paralympian. She won a silver medal at the 2012 Summer Paralympics in Women's single sculls rowing.

References

External links 

1980 births
Living people
French female rowers
Paralympic silver medalists for France
Paralympic bronze medalists for France
Rowers at the 2012 Summer Paralympics
Rowers at the 2020 Summer Paralympics
Medalists at the 2012 Summer Paralympics
Medalists at the 2020 Summer Paralympics
World Rowing Championships medalists for France
Knights of the Ordre national du Mérite
Paralympic medalists in rowing
Paralympic rowers of France
21st-century French women